Federico Reparez (16 November 1899 – 4 April 1979) was a Spanish sprinter. He competed in the men's 200 metres at the 1920 Summer Olympics.

References

1899 births
1979 deaths
Athletes (track and field) at the 1920 Summer Olympics
Spanish male sprinters
Olympic athletes of Spain
Place of birth missing